Norway competed at the 1984 Summer Paralympics in Stoke Mandeville, Great Britain and New York City, United States. 64 competitors from Norway won 90 medals including 30 gold, 30 silver and 30 bronze, and finished 10th in the medal table.

Medalists

Gold medalists

Silver medalists

Bronze medalists

See also 
 Norway at the Paralympics
 Norway at the 1984 Summer Olympics

References 

Norway at the Paralympics
1984 in Norwegian sport
Nations at the 1984 Summer Paralympics